"Feudin' and Fightin" is a song written by Al Dubin and Burton Lane, sung by Dorothy Shay (billed as "The Park Avenue Hillbilly"), and released in 1947 on the Columbia label (catalog no. 37189). In August 1947, it reached No. 4 on the Billboard folk chart. It was also ranked as the No. 12 record on the Billboard 1947 year-end folk juke box chart.

References

American country music songs
1947 songs
Songs with music by Burton Lane
Songs with lyrics by Al Dubin